Rikochet may refer to:

Rikochet, the working title for the 2014 video game Rekoil
Rikochet, a character from the TV show ¡Mucha Lucha!
Rikochet, professional wrestler; see WWC World Junior Heavyweight Championship

See also 
 Ricochet (disambiguation)